The Prairie Grove Commercial Historic District encompasses part of the historic commercial downtown area  of Prairie Grove, Arkansas.  It extends for about 1-1/2 blocks on the south side of East Buchanan Street, from Mock Street to an alley east of Neal Street.  The buildings on this side of the street more mostly built in the late 19th and early 20th centuries, and are good examples of brick and stone commercial architecture of the period.  The district also includes a small portion of Mock Park, and two buildings constructed in the 1960s.

The district was listed on the National Register of Historic Places in 2018.

See also
National Register of Historic Places listings in Washington County, Arkansas

References

Historic districts on the National Register of Historic Places in Arkansas
Buildings and structures in Prairie Grove, Arkansas
National Register of Historic Places in Washington County, Arkansas